Václav Drchal (born 25 July 1999) is a Czech professional footballer who plays as a forward for Czech First League club Bohemians 1905 on loan from Sparta Prague as a striker.

A product of the České Budějovice youth set-up, Drchal joined Sparta Prague in 2016. After impressing in the Under-19s, he scored on his professional debut in February 2018.

Club career

Dynamo České Budějovice 
Drchal began his career at hometown club Dynamo České Budějovice before joining the Sparta Prague youth set-up in 2016.

Sparta Prague 
Having scored 22 goals in 15 games for the Under-19s in the 1. Dorostinecká Liga, as well as two goals in both the Premier League International Cup and UEFA Youth League, Drchal was rewarded with a chance to join the first team.

On 8 January 2018, he signed a contract extension securing his future at the club until June 2020.

The following day, he scored a hat-trick within nine minutes of coming off the bench for his first non-competitive appearance in a 7–2 win against FC MAS Táborsko. Drchal then joined the first team on a winter training camp in Spain.

On 25 February, he made his competitive debut in a 1–1 draw with 1. FC Slovácko. Drchal scored his first goal for the club in the 53rd minute to give his side the lead. In doing so, he became the third youngest player to score on their debut in the Czech top flight – only Petr Ruman and Vladimir Stork were younger when they scored in debuts in the 1993–94 and 1994–95 seasons.

International career 
On 2 September 2017, Drchal made his youth international debut in a 2–1 defeat to Republic of Ireland Under-19s. Two days later, he made a second appearance – once again against the Republic of Ireland – and scored in another 2–1 friendly defeat.

After being named as an unused substitute in a 5–0 win against Armenia in 2018 UEFA European Under-19 Championship qualification, he made appearances off the bench in victories against Luxembourg and Scotland as Czech Republic topped their group with maximum points.

Career statistics

References

External links
Profile at sparta.cz

1999 births
Living people
Czech footballers
Czech Republic youth international footballers
Czech Republic under-21 international footballers
AC Sparta Prague players
Czech First League players
Association football forwards
Sportspeople from České Budějovice
FK Mladá Boleslav players
Dynamo Dresden players
2. Bundesliga players
Czech expatriate footballers
Czech expatriate sportspeople in Germany
Expatriate footballers in Germany
Bohemians 1905 players